Taner Kılıç (born 1969) is a Turkish civil rights activist who is one of the founding members of the Turkey section of the human rights organisation Amnesty International and its president since 2014. Kılıç was detained by Turkish authorities for alleged terrorist activities on 6 June 2017, during the 2016–17 purges in Turkey.

He remained in detention until 15 August 2018. On 3 July 2020, he was sentenced to six years in prison. Amnesty condemned the verdict as a "travesty of justice".

Education and career
Kılıç studied at Dokuz Eylül University, graduating from its law school in 1991, and practised as a lawyer since 1993. He cofounded the Association for Solidarity with Refugees (Mültecilerle Dayanışma Derneği) and was the head of its board from 2008 to 2014. , he was a member of the Immigration and Asylum Commission of the Izmir Bar Association and of the Refugee Rights Study Group of the Turkish Bars Association.

Amnesty International 
Kılıç is one of the founding members of Amnesty International Turkey, of which he became president in 2014.

Arrest during 2016–17 purges
Kılıç was detained by Turkish authorities on 6 June 2017 and charged with use of the smartphone program ByLock and membership of a terrorist organisation. One of Turkey's supreme courts declared in September 2017 that having ByLock installed on the phone of an accused person was sufficient to establish that person's membership of the Gülen movement. Amnesty denied Kılıç downloaded ByLock and said the only evidence presented for this claim was that according to the prosecutor the app was on his phone in August 2014. almost three years before his arrest. Twenty two other lawyers were detained together with Kılıç. These detentions took place during the second year of the 2016–17 purges in Turkey, during which 40,000 public employees were arrested and 120,000 were dismissed or suspended from their jobs. On 26 October 2017, Amnesty International Turkey's director, was released from prison in Turkey, while an Izmir court ordered that Kılıç remain in detention.

The Los Angeles Times commented that the Turkish president Erdoğan, in power since 2014, had earlier been supported by Amnesty International when he was imprisoned for a poem he wrote in 1998.

On 31 January 2018, an Istanbul court ordered that Kılıç be conditionally released. The prosecutor in the case appealed, and on 1 February, the court accepted the appeal, ordering that Kılıç remain in detention for the full length of his trial.

References

External links
 Amnesty International Turkey page on Taner Kılıç

1969 births
Living people
Amnesty International people
Dokuz Eylül University alumni
Prisoners and detainees of Turkey
Gülen movement

fa:تانر کیلیچ